Susan Elizabeth George (born February 26, 1949) is an American writer of mystery novels set in Great Britain.

She is best known for a series of novels featuring Inspector Thomas Lynley.  The 21st book in the series appeared in January 2022. The first 11 were adapted for television by the BBC as earlier episodes of The Inspector Lynley Mysteries.

Biography 

Elizabeth George was born in Warren, Ohio, the second child of Robert Edwin and Anne (née Rivelle) George. She has an older brother, author Robert Rivelle George. Her mother was a nurse, and her father a manager for a conveyor company. The family moved to the San Francisco Bay Area when she was 18 months old as her father wanted to get away from Midwestern weather.

She was a student of English, having received a teaching certificate from the University of California, Riverside. While teaching English in the public school system, she completed a master's degree in counseling and psychology. She received an honorary doctorate in humane letters from Cal State University Fullerton in 2004 and was awarded an honorary Masters in Fine Arts from the Northwest Institute of Literary Arts in 2010. She also established the Elizabeth George Foundation in 1997.

George married Ira Jay Toibin in 1971 and they divorced in 1995. George is currently married to Tom McCabe.

Career 
Her first published novel was A Great Deliverance (1988). It introduces Detective Inspector Thomas Lynley, in private life the Earl of Asherton, privately educated (Eton College and Oxford University); his partner Detective Sergeant Barbara Havers, grammar-school-educated and from a working-class background—both from Scotland Yard; Helen Clyde, Lynley's girlfriend and later wife; and Lynley's former school friend, the forensic scientist Simon St. James and his wife, Deborah.

Awards 

George's first novel, A Great Deliverance, was favorably received by the mystery fiction community.

It won the Agatha Award for Best First Novel in 1988 and the 1989 Anthony Award in the same category. It was nominated for an Edgar Award in 1988.

Bibliography

Fiction: Inspector Lynley 
 1988: A Great Deliverance
 1989: Payment in Blood
 1990: Well-Schooled in Murder
 1991: A Suitable Vengeance
 1992: For the Sake of Elena
 1992: Missing Joseph
 1993: Playing for the Ashes
 1996: In the Presence of the Enemy
 1997: Deception on His Mind
 1999: In Pursuit of the Proper Sinner
 2001: A Traitor to Memory
 2003: A Place of Hiding
 2005: With No One as Witness
 2006: What Came Before He Shot Her
 2008: Careless in Red
 2010: This Body of Death
 2012: Believing The Lie
 2013: Just One Evil Act
 2015: A Banquet of Consequences
 2018: The Punishment She Deserves
 2022: Something to Hide

Whidbey Island Saga 
 2012: The Edge of Nowhere (The Edge of Nowhere: Saratoga Woods or The Edge of Nowhere 01: The Dog House)
 2013: The Edge of the Water (The Edge of the Water: Saratoga Woods)
 2015: The Edge of the Shadows
 2016: The Edge of the Light

Short Story Collections 
 2001: The Evidence Exposed (Short story collection UK)
 2002: I, Richard (short story collection)
 2004: A Moment on the Edge: 100 Years of Crime Stories by Women (editor)

Non-fiction 
 2004: Write Away
 2020: Mastering the Process - from Idea to Novel

References 

1949 births
20th-century American novelists
20th-century American women writers
21st-century American novelists
21st-century American women writers
Agatha Award winners
American mystery writers
American thriller writers
American women novelists
Anthony Award winners
Living people
Novelists from Ohio
People from Warren, Ohio
University of California, Riverside alumni
Women mystery writers
Women thriller writers
Writers from San Francisco